Urad Qianqi is a banner of the Inner Mongolia Autonomous Region, People's Republic of China. It is located in the west of the region, situated on the northern (left) bank of the Yellow River, on the Ordos Loop, and in between the cities of Bayan Nur and Baotou. Its seat is the town of Mona-uul. Other towns include Dashetai (Tashetai).

Climate

References

Banners of Inner Mongolia
Bayannur